Hanna–McEuen is the only studio album by American country music duo Hanna–McEuen. It was released on August 16, 2005 by DreamWorks Records Nashville. The album charted at number 42 on Top Country Albums and included the single "Something Like a Broken Heart", which peaked at number 38 on Hot Country Songs.
However the duo also recorded a DVD-Audio/Video project titled "Tried and True" in 2007 for AIX Records, which featured a guest appearance by country guitarist Albert Lee.

Critical reception
It received positive reviews. Stephen Thomas Erlewine of Allmusic called it "one of the best debuts of 2005" and cited the duo's country rock and alternative country influences, rating it four-and-a-half stars out of five. Entertainment Weekly reviewer Chris Willman gave a B+, comparing its sound to The Mavericks and calling it "an euphonic, often euphoric alternative." Jack Lowe of About.com gave it five stars, saying that it was "very smooth and fun to listen to."

Track listing

Personnel
As listed in liner notes.

Hanna–McEuen
Jaime Hanna – acoustic guitar, electric guitar, baritone guitar, mandolin, harmonica, vocals
Jonathan McEuen – acoustic guitar, electric guitar, resonator guitar, mandolin, banjo, vocals

Additional musicians
Dan Dugmore – pedal steel guitar
Kenny Greenberg – electric guitar
Greg Morrow – drums
Gordon Mote – piano, keyboards, Hammond B-3 organ
Phil Salazar – fiddle (track 12)
Gabe Witcher – fiddle (tracks 3, 6, 7, 12)
Glenn Worf – bass guitar]

Chart performance

References

DreamWorks Records albums
2005 debut albums
Albums produced by James Stroud
Hanna–McEuen albums